Yahad (lit. Together) is a small kibbutz in northern Israel. Located in the Lower Galilee, it falls under the jurisdiction of Misgav Regional Council. It has a population of 35 families.

The kibbutz was founded in 1992 by a gar'in whose members were involved in Transcendental Meditation.

Kibbutzim
Populated places established in 1992
Populated places in Northern District (Israel)
1992 establishments in Israel